Who Watches the Watchmen? is an adventure published by Mayfair Games in 1986 for the superhero role-playing game DC Heroes that features the Watchmen.

Plot summary
Who Watches the Watchmen? is an adventure featuring the DC Comics characters from the Watchmen comics, set in an alternate world in 1966, before the Keene Act made vigilantes illegal. The player characters, representing people who have been mulling over whether to become crime fighters, have been summoned by Captain Metropolis following a series of kidnappings of retired superheroes and people associated with them.

Publication history
Mayfair Games published the superhero role-playing game DC Heroes in 1985 under license from DC Comics. Who Watches the Watchmen?, published in 1987 as a 32-page softcover book, was written by Dan Greenberg, with cartography by Jerry O'Malley and Ike Scott, and cover art by John HIggins (color), and Dave Gibbons (sketch, pencils and inks), who also did the interior illustrations.

Reception
Marcus Rowland reviewed Who Watches the Watchmen? for White Dwarf #91, and stated that "Although this isn't the complete Watchmen sourcepack that I would have liked, it's a lot better than some previous DC material. At 32 pages, with moderately large type, it isn't the best value I've seen in roleplaying games. On the other hand, it isn't as disappointing."

In the October 1987 edition of Dragon (Issue #126), Ken Rolston initially liked the "intriguing" premise of the setting, and said, "If this were a Watchman source pack, it would be pretty interesting. Unfortunately, it's not — it's just an adventure, and one with a rather thin plot." He noted that rather than generating their own characters, players had to use one of the not-very-interesting pregenerated Watchman characters. Speculating that the designers had been "encumbered by restrictions imposed by the established plotlines and characterizations", Rolston did not recommend this product, saying, "read the comic series and skip the licensed role-playing adventure."

References

DC Heroes adventures
Role-playing game supplements introduced in 1986
Watchmen